Republicrat or Demopublican (also Repubocrat, Demican, Democan, and Republocrat) are portmanteau names for both of the two major political parties in the United States, the Republican Party and the Democratic Party, collectively. These derogatory names first appeared in the 1872 U.S. presidential election.

The terms have several meanings. One use is to insult politicians that the speaker believes are too moderate or centrist. This use is similar to saying that a Republican is a "Republican in Name Only" (RINO) or a Democrat is a "Democrat in Name Only" (DINO). Another use is to indicate that the two major parties are essentially interchangeable from the speaker's perspective because neither major party supports the changes that the speaker wants to see. This often carries an unspoken implication that the U.S. is in spirit a dominant-party system.

Usage

Insult towards moderates
Republicans have often portrayed themselves to be pro-business and aggressive on foreign policy; Democrats have tended to campaign on more liberal social policies and a more important role for government-funded social programs. Merriam-Webster Dictionary defines it as "a member of the Democratic party esp. in the southern states who supports to a large extent the policy and measures of the Republican party". Oxford Dictionaries defines the term as "[a] person whose political philosophy is a blend of policies and principles from both the Republican and Democratic parties".

The term is sometimes used in a pejorative sense by members of one party to attack members of their party who are either centrist or who have what they perceive to be the wrong ideology. The term Republicrat is commonly used by liberal Democrats to attack conservative and centrist members of the party, such as Senator Joe Lieberman. On the Republican side, George W. Bush, Mitt Romney, and Newt Gingrich are common examples of Republicrats due to their liberal stances on various political issues. Another term used by liberal Democrats to describe conservative and centrist members of their party is "Democrat In Name Only" or "DINO"; a conservative Republican term for liberal and centrist Republicans is "Republican In Name Only" or "RINO".

Argument that Democrats and Republicans are interchangeable
Another usage of the term puts the words together in order to voice the opinion that the two mainstream American political parties are so ideologically similar as to be interchangeable. This usage often expresses the sentiment of ordinary citizens who see all politicians as serving the same special interests and make little distinction between the two parties. Earl Killian's U.S. political glossary defines the term as "a portmanteau of the words 'Republican' and 'Democrat' ... used to symbolize the one-party nature of U.S. politics, when it comes to issues on which the dominant parties of the two-party system agree ... . In this view ... Republicrats is then the name of the single U.S. political party, and the Republicans and Democrats are seen as factions of this one-party system, rather than as true independent parties."

Some commentators, such as right-wing radio talk-show host Michael Savage and left-wing activist Ralph Nader, who have both used the terms, have opined on how it is often hard to tell the parties apart, leading to the term's popularity. This was a view shared on the left by the Green Party during the 2000 U.S. Presidential election, whose bumper stickers read: "Bush and Gore make me want to Ralph." Former Dead Kennedys vocalist and Green Party member Jello Biafra has used the term during interviews. In 2004, boxing promoter Don King told Larry King he was a Republicrat. He defined it as being for "whoever's going to be doing something or the upward mobility of America, black and white alike".

Equivalent terms in other countries
An equivalent term used in the United Kingdom is Lib-Lab-Con or LibLabCon, a pejorative portmanteau referring to the three main political parties (the Liberal Democrats, the Labour Party, and the Conservative Party), suggesting that there are no real differences between the three and that the UK is effectively a single-party system.

An equivalent term used in Canada is Lib-NDP-Con or LibNDPCon, a pejorative portmanteau referring to the three main political parties (the Liberal Party, the New Democratic Party (NDP), and the Conservative Party), suggesting that there are no real differences between the three and that Canada is effectively a single-party system.

See also
Bipartisanship in US politics
Boll weevil (politics)
Duverger's law
Problem Solvers Caucus
Rockefeller Republican
Southern Democrats
Third party (United States)
Two-party system

References

External links

 Sean Masterson's Republicrats parody website

Political slurs for people
Political terminology of the United States